Lindokuhle Welemu (born  in South Africa) is a South African rugby union player for the Griffons (rugby union) in the Currie Cup and in the Rugby Challenge. His regular position is lock.

Career

Border Bulldogs

Welemu was one of several amateur club players brought into the  provincial set-up at the start of 2014 after the professional side was declared bankrupt. He was included in their squad for the 2014 Vodacom Cup competition and made his debut in their Round Three match against Kenyan invitational side , helping the Border Bulldogs to an 18–17 win, their only victory of the competition. He started three more matches and also came on as a substitute in their match against  as the Border Bulldogs finished bottom of the log.

References

South African rugby union players
Living people
1991 births
Rugby union locks
Border Bulldogs players
Southern Kings players
Eastern Province Elephants players
Griffons (rugby union) players
Rugby union players from East London, Eastern Cape